Delias diaphana is a species of pierine butterfly endemic to the Philippines, where it is found only on Mindanao.

The wingspan is 80–90 mm.

Subspecies
Delias diaphana diaphana (Mt. Apo, Mindanao)
Delias diaphana sagaguchii Tsukada & Nishiyama, 1980 (Masara Maine, south-eastern Mindanao)
Delias diaphana basilisae Schroder, 1893 (Mt.Malindang-Zamboanga, western Mindanao)
Delias diaphana yatai Nakano, 1993 (Tandag, north-eastern Mindanao)

References

External links
images representing Delias diaphana  at Encyclopedia of Life

diaphana
Butterflies described in 1878
Butterflies of Asia
Taxa named by Georg Semper